Saint Materiana is a Welsh saint, patron of two churches in Cornwall and one in Wales. Alternative spellings are Madrun and Madryn. The name was corrupted to "Marcelliana" in medieval times. Another spelling of her name sometimes used is "Mertheriana" or "Merthiana", resembling the Welsh merthyr - "martyr".

Origin
Materiana is said to have been a princess of the 5th century, the eldest of three daughters of King Vortimer the Blessed, who, after her father's death, ruled over Gwent with her husband Prince Ynyr. She is said to be the "Madryn" in whose name (along with her handmaiden Anhun (Antonia)) the church at Trawsfynydd is dedicated, and Carn Fadryn/Fadrun is named. Matrona was a widespread Roman name, and there is no evidence of any purported connection with a pre-Christian goddess named Modron.

The Hymn to St Materiana in use at Tintagel calls her "Materiana, holy Mother" and prays her to "Over thy people still preside, over thy household, clothed in scarlet vesture of love and holy pride" and continues "Thy children rise and call thee blessed, gathered around thee at thy side." The 'Hymn to St Materiana' is not an ancient hymn, and of Anglican use.

Minster church

 
The original Forrabury / Minster boundary crossed the river so the harbour end of the village was in Forrabury and the upriver area in Minster. The churches were established some time earlier than the settlement at Boscastle (in Norman times when a castle was built there). The Celtic name of Minster was Talkarn but it was renamed Minster in Anglo-Saxon times because of a monastery on the site. Until the Reformation St Materiana's tomb was preserved in the church. Traditions of the saint were recorded by William Worcestre in 1478: he states that her tomb was venerated at Minster and that her feast day was 9 April. The parish feast traditionally celebrated at Tintagel was 19 October, the feast day of St Denys, patron of the chapel at Trevena (the proper date is 9 October but the feast has moved forward due to the calendar reform of 1752).

Tintagel and Trawsfynydd churches

The first church at Tintagel was probably in the 6th century, founded as a daughter church of Minster: these are the only churches dedicated to the saint though she is usually identified with Madryn, Princess of Gwent, who has a church dedicated to her at Trawsfynydd in Gwynedd.

St Materiana's Church, Tintagel was restored by architect James Piers St Aubynin 1870. The north doorway dates to around 1080. There are two memorials which portray St Materiana: a statue in the chancel and a stained glass window in the nave.

The Cornish historian Charles Thomas proposed that the Norman church of Tintagel and its dedication to St Materiana were due to the munificence of William de Bottreaux, lord of Boscastle rather than the Earl of Cornwall.

See also

Puerto Madryn—a town in Argentina named after Madryn, Nefyn, Wales
Carn Fadrun—a hill in North Wales named after the saint
Nefyn—a town in North Wales (the Madryn estate is nearby)

References

Further reading
Canner, A. C. (1982) The Parish of Tintagel. Camelford: A. C. Canner; pp. 5–6, 94-95

External links

Vortigern Studies: Modrun, granddaughter of Vortigern
Early British Kingdoms: St. Madrun

Medieval Welsh saints
Medieval Cornish saints
Late Ancient Christian female saints
5th-century Christian saints
Female saints of medieval Wales
5th-century English people
5th-century English women
5th-century Welsh people
5th-century Welsh women